Dr. Phil may refer to:

 Phil McGraw (born 1950), U.S. TV personality, with a doctorate in clinical psychology, without an active license, nicknamed "Dr. Phil" by Oprah Winfrey for his segments/guest slots on Oprah, the Oprah Winfrey Show, starting in the 1990s
 Dr. Phil (talk show), U.S. TV talk show started in 2002, starring Phil McGraw
 Doctor of Philosophy (Dr.Phil.), an advanced degree in many fields
 a person holding a doctorate in the field of philosophy

See also

 Dr. Phil van Neuter, a Muppet
 Doctor of Philology, a person holding a doctorate in philology
 Phil (disambiguation)
 DR (disambiguation)